Paralopostega dives is a moth of the family Opostegidae. It was first described by Lord Walsingham in 1907. It is endemic to the Hawaiian island of Kauai.

The larvae feed on Melicope species (M. anisata, M. kauaiensis and M. gayana). They probably mine the leaves of their host plant.

External links
Generic Revision of the Opostegidae, with a Synoptic Catalog of the World's Species (Lepidoptera: Nepticuloidea)

Opostegidae
Endemic moths of Hawaii
Biota of Kauai
Moths described in 1907